Jose Pearson TB Hospital is a specialised Provincial government funded TB hospital situated outside Port Elizabeth in South Africa. It was established in 1966 and used to be a SANTA TB hospital.

The hospital departments include an Out Patients Department, Pharmacy, Anti-Retroviral (ARV) treatment for HIV/AIDS, X-ray Services, Laundry Services, Kitchen Services and Mortuary.

References
 Jose Pearson TB Hospital

Hospitals in the Eastern Cape